Chang Gedo (born 1941), is an early Hapkido practitioner and master of the art, who brought his style of this Korean fighting system to the west in 1973.

Life

Chang Gedo lived until his early twenties in a mountain monastery in Chungnam Province, learning hoshinsul (self-defence techniques) from his father a Buddhist monk. Upon leaving the monastery, Chang Gedo became one of the few men formally recognised as a master of Hapkido (1964) within Ji Han Jae's newly formed association. He then opened his school in Korea and called it Wol Ge Kwan which means The Victor's Laurel. In 1973, Master Chang turned his Hapkido school in Korea over to Choi Yong Sul when the Korean Hapkido Association dispatched him to the United States of America. He has demonstrated and taught throughout the USA, finally settling in Lombard, Illinois where he opened his first U.S. School, Chang's Hapkido Academy.  Chang’s Hapkido Academy has schools across America and expanded to England in 1993 under Tammy Parlour.

Accomplishments

He was the first to develop Hapkido techniques specifically for police personnel. His teaching abilities so impressed the Korean Government, that they created a special award for Best Martial Arts Instructor, and presented it to Master Chang.  Chang Gedo is an 8th degree master of Hapkido and president of the World Hapkido Union; he is also an author of many books and a world-renowned speaker on Ki, spirituality and human behaviour.

Further reading

Kimm, He-Young. Hapkido (alternately The Hapkido Bible). Andrew Jackson Press, Baton Rouge, Louisiana 1991
Fighters Magazine, September 1995, P.15-16, Article by Sam Plum, Gedo Chang Master of Ki Power.
TKD & Korean Martial Arts Magazine, June 1996, p26-27, Article by Jean Dobbrey, Hapkido’s Pressure Points.
Fighters Magazine, June 1998, P.34-36, Article by Sam Plum, Master Gedo Chang and the Korean Art of Hapkido.
TKD & Korean Martial Arts Magazine, April 1999, p76-79, Article by Tammy Parlour, An Exclusive Interview with Grandmaster Gedo Chang.

Sources

External links
Chang’s Hapkido Academy homepage
Ki Meditation

South Korean hapkido practitioners
1941 births
Living people